Saturn Devouring His Son is a painting by Spanish artist Francisco Goya. It is traditionally interpreted as a depiction of the Greek myth of the Titan Cronus (known as Saturn in Roman mythology) eating one of his offspring. Fearing a prophecy foretold by Gaea that predicted he would be overthrown by one of his children, Saturn ate each one upon their birth. The work is one of the 14 so-called Black Paintings that Goya painted directly on the walls of his house sometime between 1819 and 1823. It was transferred to canvas after Goya's death and is now in the Museo del Prado in Madrid.

Background

In 1819, Goya purchased a house on the banks of Manzanares near Madrid called Quinta del Sordo (Villa of the Deaf Man). It was a two-story house which was named after a previous occupant who had been deaf, although the name was fitting for Goya too, who had been left deaf after contracting a fever in 1792. Between 1819 and 1823, when he left the house to move to Bordeaux, Goya produced a series of 14 paintings using mixed technique on the walls of the house. 

Although he initially decorated the rooms of the house with more inspiring images, in time he painted over them all with the intensely haunting pictures known today as the Black Paintings. Created without commission for private display, these paintings may reflect the artist's state of mind late in a life that witnessed the violence of war and terror stoked by the Spanish Inquisition.

Saturn Devouring His Son was one of six works Goya painted in the dining room. It is important to note that Goya never named the works he produced at Quinta del Sordo; the names were assigned by others after his death. This interpretation of the painting sees it as a reference to the Roman myth (inspired by the original Greek myth), in which Terra (Gaea) foretold that one of the sons of Saturn would overthrow him, just as he had overthrown his father, Caelus (Uranus). To prevent this, Saturn ate his children moments after each was born, eating the gods Vesta (Hestia), Ceres (Demeter), Juno (Hera), Pluto (Hades), and Neptune (Poseidon). His wife Ops (Rhea) eventually hid his sixth child and third son, Jupiter (Zeus), on the island of Crete, deceiving Saturn by offering a stone wrapped in swaddling in his place. Unlike the painting, the myths usually portray Saturn/Kronos swallowing his children, and later vomiting them up alive after swallowing the stone, rather than violently tearing them apart as in the painting. Jupiter eventually supplanted his father just as the prophecy had predicted.

Composition and interpretations

Goya depicts a large figure feasting on a human form. The figure's head and part of the left arm have already been consumed. The right arm has probably been eaten too, though it could be folded in front of the body and held in place by the larger figure's thumbs. The larger figure is on the point of taking another bite from the left arm; as he looms from the darkness, his mouth gapes and his eyes bulge widely. The only other brightness in the picture comes from the white flesh, the red blood of the corpse, and the white knuckles of the larger figure as he digs his fingers into the back of the body. 

Various interpretations of the meaning of the picture have been offered: the conflict between youth and old age, time as the devourer of all things, the wrath of God and an allegory of the situation in Spain, where the fatherland consumed its own children in wars and revolution. There have been explanations rooted in Goya's relationships with his own son, Xavier, the only of his six children to survive to adulthood, or with his live-in housekeeper and possible mistress, Leocadia Weiss; the sex of the body being consumed cannot be determined with certainty. If Goya made any notes on the picture, they have not survived, as he never intended the picture for public exhibition.

The mood of the painting is in stark contrast to Rubens's Saturn, as the central figure is acting out of madness rather than calculating reason, and the consumed figure is completely lifeless rather than in clear pain. It is very likely Goya had seen Rubens's Saturn in his life, but the degree to which inspiration was taken (if any) is unknown.  Goya made a chalk drawing of the same subject in 1796–97: it showed a figure biting on the leg of one person while he holds another to eat, with none of the gore or madness of the later work. 

Goya scholar Fred Licht has raised doubts regarding the traditional title, stating that it may "very well be misleading." He notes that the traditional iconographical attributes associated with Saturn (such as his scythe or hourglass) are absent from the painting, and the body of the smaller figure does not resemble that of an infant, or even truly an anatomically accurate human at all. He states that much like the other Black Paintings, "one must take the title with a grain of salt." Licht offers the alternative explanation that the painting is an inversion of antisemitic artistic depictions of Jewish figures eating children, a reference to the alleged blood libel. In this way, the larger figure represents the fears of Jews manifesting in real violence against them, as "real bestiality is born of imagined bestiality," although he concedes this is impossible to prove and, like the Saturn interpretation, demonstrates the varied intent of Goya in the composition. Additionally, he argues that the very act of naming the black paintings is an attempt to impose rationale on pictures which force one to contemplate chaos and nothingness, a primary theme in the black paintings.

It has been questioned whether the consumed figure is male.

The art historian John J. Ciofalo writes that "the victim appears to be an adult and, given the curvaceous buttocks and legs, a female." Moreover, in other versions, the sons are alive and struggling or at least have heads, so the viewer is able to identify or sympathize. The victim is not struggling in Saturn's vice-like, blood-oozing grip, which literally cuts into her body, because she is dead, not to mention headless. She does not, to say the least, encourage identification. The identification flows toward Saturn. Ciofalo concludes: "The overwhelming feeling of the image is one of violent and insatiable lust, underscored, to put it mildly, by the livid and enormously engorged penis between his legs...utter male fury has hardly before or since been captured so vividly."

Transfer from the Quinta del Sordo
When Goya went into self-imposed exile in France in 1823, he passed the Quinta del Sordo to his grandson Mariano. After various changes of ownership, the house came into the possession of the Belgian Baron Émile d'Erlanger in 1874. After 70 years on the walls of the Quinta del Sordo, the murals were deteriorating badly and, in order to preserve them, the new owner of the house had them transferred to canvas under the direction of Salvador Martínez Cubells, the chief art restorer at the Museo del Prado. After showing them at the Exposition Universelle of 1878 in Paris, d'Erlanger eventually donated them to the Spanish state.  The effects of time on the murals, coupled with the inevitable damage caused by the delicate operation of mounting the crumbling plaster on canvas, meant that most of the murals required restoration work and some detail may have been lost, but in this respect Saturn Devouring His Son appears to have fared better than some of the other works.

See also
List of works by Francisco Goya

Notes

References

Bibliography

External links

19th-century paintings
Saturn (mythology) in culture
Works about cannibalism
Paintings about death
Paintings by Francisco Goya in the Museo del Prado
Paintings of Roman gods